The Kurtna Lake District is located in north-eastern Estonia. It consists of about 40 lakes within an area of 30 hectares. The lakes were formed while the area was glaciated.

The Kurtna Landscape Protection Area was established in (1987) 2005 to preserve region ecology. Total 2820 ha are under protection.

The composition of the lake waters has changed due to the district's proximity to the oil shale industry in Estonia.

Lakes 

Konsu Lake
Kurtna Väike Linajärv
Suur Linajärv
Räätsma Lake
Saarejärv
Sisalikujärv
Nõmmejärv
Niinsaare
Väike-Niinsaare Lake
Mustjärv
Haugjärv
Punane Lake
Särgjärv
Ahvenjärv
Peen-Kirjakjärv
Kirjakjärv
Valgejärv
Jaala Lake
Must-Jaala Lake
Martiska Lake
Kuradijärv
Ahnejärv
Suurjärv
Väike Laugasjärv
Piirakajärv
Vasavere Lake
Aknajärv
Virtsiku Lake
Allikjärv
Nootjärv
Kihljärv
Mätasjärv
Konnajärv
Vasavere Mustjärv
Pannjärv
Ratasjärv
Laukasoo Suurlaugas
Lusikajärv
Kulpjärv
Liivjärv
Rääkjärv
Kastjärv

References

External links